Khmer Braille is the braille alphabet of the Khmer language of Cambodia.

Charts 
In printed Khmer, the alphabet is divided into consonant letters, consonant diacritics (conjuncts), and vowel diacritics.  (That is, the Khmer alphabet is an abugida.)  In braille Khmer, however, all of these are full letters.  Out of deference to tradition, however, the braille alphabet is divided into sections according to the form in print.

Print letters
The first three rows are the stand-alone consonants in print, and the last two the stand-alone vowels.  These occur initially and after a/another vowel.

{| class="wikitable" style="text-align:center;"
|-
! Braille
|  ||  ||  ||  ||  
|  ||  ||  ||  ||  
|-
! Print
| kâk
| khâkh
| kôk
| khôkh
| ngông
| châch
| chhâchh
| chôch
| chhôchh
| nhônh
|-
! Braille
|  ||  ||  ||  ||  
|  ||  ||  ||  ||  
|-
! Print
| dâd
| thâth
| dôd
| thôth
| nân
| tât
| thâth
| tôt
| thôth
| nôn
|-
! Braille
|  ||  ||  ||  ||  
|rowspan=2|  ||  ||  ||  ||  
|-
! Print
| bâb
| phâph
| pôp
| phôph
| môm
| yôy
| rôr
| lôl
| vôv
|-
! Braille
! || 
|  ||  || rowspan=2 colspan=4|  ||  ||  
|-
! Print
| shôsh
| ssâss
| sâs
| hâh
| lâl
| 'â|-
! Braille
|  ||  ||  
! 
|  ||  ||  
|-
! Print
| ĕ
| ei
| ŏ, ŭ
| –
| u
| ŏu
| âu
|-
! Braille
|  ||  ||  ||  
|  ||  ||  
|-
! Print
| rœ̆
| rœ
| lœ̆
| lœ
| ê
| ai
| /aô
|}

As in print, the consonant letters fall into two classes which trigger different readings of associated vowels. When no vowel is written, an â or ô (depending on the consonant class) is understood. In print these two classes are simply different consonants. In braille, however, they are written the same, except that the ô class is marked by prefixing point-6. The exceptions are four ô-class consonants which do not have â-class partners,  ngô, mô, rô, vô.

Most of the stand-alone vowels are derived from the combining vowels (next section) by a prefix or suffix.

Shaded cells either have not been assigned braille codes, or are derived with combinations of diacritics not included in UNESCO (2013). Conjuncts''' (combinations of full and subscript consonants) in print are indicated with a linking  in braille.

Print diacritics
Vowels are diacritics in print, but in braille they are full letters and follow what is the host letter in print.  Thus in print  khmêr, the vowel  ê precedes the consonant cluster  khm, but in braille the vowel  ê follows the consonant cluster  khm, thus:   khmêr.  The vowels are as follows.  (In order to display properly on all browsers, the print diacritics are hosted on the letter , which is not repeated in braille.  On that host, the vowels take the upper romanized value; on a class-ô consonant they would have the lower value.)

A final h is added to several additional vowels tacking   on to one of the braille letters above:    ĕh / ĭh,   œ̆h,   êh''.

Print Khmer has several other diacritics which are not listed in UNESCO (2013) for braille.

Punctuation
Cambodian Braille punctuation is modified from Western braille.  The traditional full stop, is braille .

The same character  is used for the semicolon and the question mark.  The colon also differs from international norms.

References

French-ordered braille alphabets
Khmer language